is a museum dedicated to the history and culture of the Nakasendō's Ōta-juku and is located in the city of Minokamo, Gifu Prefecture, Japan.

Exhibits
The main focus of the exhibit is on the history and culture of Ōta-juku, one of the Nakasendō's shukuba. The displays include pieces related to Kazu-no-Miya Chikako who stayed at the shukuba while traveling the Nakasendō.

This structure is separate from the main building and is a replica of Okamoto's completed house.

Facilities information
Hours of operation
9:00am to 5:00pm
Holidays
Mondays (unless Monday is a national holiday)
Day after national holidays
Dec. 29 to Jan. 3.
Entrance fee
Free
Parking
50 spaces

Access
Tōkai-Kanjō Expressway : 10 min.
JR Central Taita Line Mino-Ōta Station: 10 min. walk

References

History museums in Japan
Museums in Gifu Prefecture
Minokamo, Gifu
Museums established in 2006
2006 establishments in Japan